Shine or Go Crazy is a 2015 South Korean television series based on the novel of the same name by Hyun Go-woon about the romance between a Goryeo prince and a Balhae princess. Starring Jang Hyuk, Oh Yeon-seo, Lee Hanee and Lim Ju-hwan, it aired on MBC from January 19 to April 7, 2015 on Mondays and Tuesdays at 22:00 for 24 episodes.

Plot
Wang So was born a prince of Goryeo, but because a prophecy foretells that he will turn the country into a river of blood, he is exiled from the palace and shunned by the royal family. Having lost his place as the rightful heir to the throne, he lives an isolated life, and in Wang So's absence, his illegitimate half-brother Wang Uk makes an ambitious play for power.

Shin Yool is the princess of Later Balhae, and she narrowly escaped death as a child at the hands of her own people because of a prophecy that she is fated to become "the light of another nation". She and Wang So have a whirlwind marriage, and as husband and wife, begin to grow closer and fall in love.

Cast

Main
Jang Hyuk as Wang So, King Gwangjong (So-so)
Choi Han as young Wang So
Oh Yeon-seo as Shin Yool / Gaebong
Jung Won as young Shin Yool
Lee Hanee as Hwangbo Yeo-won
Choo Ye-jin as young Hwangbo Yeo-won
Lim Ju-hwan as Wang Wook, Hwangbo Yeo-won's brother
Lee Hyun-bin as young Wang Wook
Lee Deok-hwa as Wang Shik-ryum
Ryu Seung-soo as Wang Yo, King Jeongjong
Lee Joon-seo as young Wang Yo
Na In-woo as Se Won / Ho Yool
Jo Yong-jin as young Se Won

Supporting

People around Wang So
Kim Roi-ha as Eun Chun, Wang So's advisor and Goryeo's best warrior
Shin Seung-hwan as Gil Bok
Park Min-soo as young Gil Bok 
Ji Soo-won as Empress Dowager Yoo, Wang So and Wang Yo's mother

People around Shin Yool
Heo Jung-min as Yang Gyoo-dal, Shin Yool's adopted big brother
Kim Sun-young as Baek Myo
Ahn Gil-kang as Kang Myung
Jung Woo-shik as Kyung, Shin Yool's bodyguard
Lee Eun-soo as Choon Ah
Jung Jae-hyung as Na Moo, Choon Ah's son

People around Hwangbo Yeo-won
Kim Young-sun as Yum Shil, Hwangbo Yeo-won's bodyguard

People around Wang Shik-ryum
Kang Ki-young as Wang Poong, Wang Shik-ryum's son
Park Hyun-woo as Park Sool, Wang Shik-ryum's loyal right-handman

Warriors and officials
Kim Byung-ok as Choi Ji-mong
Woo Sang-jeon as Hwangbo Je-gong, Hwangbo Yeo-won's maternal grandfather
Seo Bum-suk as Wang Gyo / Dae Choong-gwang, Balhae's last prince and Shin Yool's half big brother
Kim Jin-ho as Park Soo-kyung
Lee Jung-hoon as Yoo Kwon-yool
Song Young-jae as Yoo Mok-won
Ahn Suk-hwan as Kim Jong-shik (cameo)
Choi Jae-ho as Hwang Gyoo-ee
Kim Kwang-shik as Baek Choong-hyun

Royal Princes
Oh Eun-chan as Wang Tae, Wang So and Wang Yo's oldest brother
Ji Eun-sung as Wang Won
Shin Jung-yoon as Wang Rim
Ha Dae-ro as Wang Moon
Yoon Dae-yong as Wang Jik
Park Sun-ho as Wang Wi
Yeo Ee-joo as Wang Jong

People in Wolhyangru
Jin Seo-yeon as Geum Soon, a head gisaeng
Na Hye-jin as Chung Ok, a gisaeng
Lee Seo-yeon as Ryung Hwa, a gisaeng

Other
Nam Kyung-eup as Wang Geon, King Taejo
Kim Boop-rae as General Kwak
Seo Eun as Shin Yool's mother, Balhae's royal consort
Jo Jae-ryung as a snake-eye man
Wi Yang-ho as a Bettor
Choi Gwi-hwa as a Manager
Im Kang-heon as a young servant
Kim Moon-jin as Dan Joo
Kim Han-sup as a nobleman from Gyeongsan
Lee Myung-shik as Lee Jung-joo as noblemen from Geumju
Maeng Bong-hak as a servant

Ratings

Awards and nominations

International broadcasts
 - Joy Prime

References

External links
 

Shine or Be Mad at MBC Global Media

2015 South Korean television series debuts
2015 South Korean television series endings
MBC TV television dramas
Television series set in the 10th century
Television series set in Goryeo
South Korean historical television series
Television shows based on South Korean novels